Arnd Peiffer (born 18 March 1987) is a German former biathlete. His greatest achievements were sprint victories in the 2018 Winter Olympics and the Biathlon World Championships 2011. During his career, he also won three World Championship relay golds as well as several other Olympic and World Championship medals.

Peiffer announced his retirement in March 2021.

Biathlon results
All results are sourced from the International Biathlon Union.

Olympic Games
3 medals (1 gold, 1 silver, 1 bronze)

*The mixed relay was added as an event in 2014.

World Championships
17 medals (5 gold, 6 silver, 6 bronze)

*During Olympic seasons competitions are only held for those events not included in the Olympic program.
**The single mixed relay was added as an event in 2019.

World Cup

Individual victories
11 victories (7 Sp, 2 Pu, 1 In, 1 MS)

*Results are from UIPMB and IBU races which include the Biathlon World Cup, Biathlon World Championships and the Winter Olympic Games.

References

External links

1987 births
Living people
People from Wolfenbüttel (district)
German male biathletes
Biathletes at the 2010 Winter Olympics
Biathletes at the 2014 Winter Olympics
Biathletes at the 2018 Winter Olympics
Cross-country skiers at the 2014 Winter Olympics
Olympic biathletes of Germany
Olympic cross-country skiers of Germany
Medalists at the 2014 Winter Olympics
Medalists at the 2018 Winter Olympics
Olympic medalists in biathlon
Olympic gold medalists for Germany
Olympic silver medalists for Germany
Olympic bronze medalists for Germany
Biathlon World Championships medalists
Holmenkollen Ski Festival winners
Sportspeople from Lower Saxony
21st-century German people